This is a list of candidates of the 1968 New South Wales state election. The election was held on 24 February 1968.

Retiring Members
Note: The Liberal MLA for Bligh, Morton Cohen, died shortly before the election. No by-election was held.

Labor
 Howard Fowles MLA (Illawarra)
 Fred Green MLA (Redfern)
 Frank Hawkins MLA (Newcastle)
 Bob Heffron MLA (Botany)
 Leo Nott MLA (Mudgee)
 Cliff Mallam MLA (Dulwich Hill)
 John McMahon MLA (Balmain)
 William Wattison MLA (Sturt)

Liberal
 George Brain MLA (Willoughby)

Country
 Richmond Manyweathers MLA (Casino)

Legislative Assembly
Sitting members are shown in bold text. Successful candidates are highlighted in the relevant colour. Where there is possible confusion, an asterisk (*) is also used.

See also
 Members of the New South Wales Legislative Assembly, 1968–1971

References
 

1968